Yves Zahnd (born 4 October 1985) is a Swiss former professional footballer who played as a defender. He played 77 games with FC Thun.

Career
Zahnd played for FC Thun and SC Kriens.  Yves Zahnd coached at FC Thun junior teams and then took over for the first time in his career a coaching job at an active team after he was forced to retire in July 2011, due to injury.

He later became a football coach, and was appointed as manager of FC Bern 1894's second-team in May 2013.

Injury
In 2008 the club doctor for FC Thun announced that, though it had already been operated on for a torn ACL and cartilage damage, his knee would probably no longer permit a professional career. Because of this, at the age of 25 Zahnd was forced to retire from professional football due to his extensive knee injury and an associated osteoarthritis.

Career statistics

References
1. Y. Zahnd (Switzerland)

https://int.soccerway.com/players/yves-zahnd/11465/

2. Yves Zahnd (footballdatabase.eu)

http://www.footballdatabase.eu/football.joueurs.yves.zahnd.22839.en.html

3. Das Knie spielt nicht mehr mit (bernerzeitung.ch/)

http://www.bernerzeitung.ch/sport/fussball/Das-Knie-spielt-nicht-mehr-mit/story/25012337

External links

1985 births
Living people
Swiss men's footballers
FC Thun players
SC Kriens players
Swiss Challenge League players
Association football defenders
Swiss football managers